Wang Chen (born 21 June 1976) is a Chinese badminton player who later represented Hong Kong.

Personal life 
Wang married mainland Chinese badminton player Zheng Yumin in 2002. Their son Zheng Xingjun (鄭星駿）Longlong (龍龍) was born in 2012，second son Zheng Xingrong (鄭星榮） was born in 2015.

Career 
In 1994, Wang won the gold medal at the World Junior Championships in the girls' singles.

In 1996, she won the women's singles title at the Thailand Open. She was also on the losing national team against a strong Indonesian squad in Uber Cup that year.

In 1997, she back-to-back won the Thailand Open women's singles title.

In 2002, she won the Chinese Taipei Open.

In 2003, she won a gold medal at the  Asian Championships.

In 2004, Wang played badminton at the 2004 Summer Olympics. In women's singles, she defeated Lorena Blanco of Peru and Yao Jie of the Netherlands in the first two rounds. In the quarterfinals, Wang lost to Zhang Ning of the People's Republic of China 9–11, 11–6, 11–7.

In 2005, she won the Indonesia Open and Asian Championships.

In 2006, she won the gold medal at the Asian Games and for the third times clinched the Asian Championships women's singles title.

In 2007, she played at the World Championships and won the silver medal. She was defeated in the final by Zhu Lin, of China, 8–21, 12–21

Wang competed at the 2008 Summer Olympics. She was seeded fourth going into the competition. She defeated Eva Sládeková of Slovakia, 21–7, 21–7 to advance to the third round.  There she lost to Saina Nehwal of India, 19–21, 21–11, 11–21.

She won the 2008 Hong Kong Super Series.

Achievements

World Championships 
Women's singles

World Cup 
Women's singles

Asian Games 
Women's singles

Asian Championships 
Women's singles

World Junior Championships 
Girls' singles

BWF Superseries 
The BWF Superseries, launched on 14 December 2006 and implemented in 2007, is a series of elite badminton tournaments sanctioned by the Badminton World Federation (BWF). BWF Superseries has two levels, the Superseries and Superseries Premier. A season of Superseries features twelve tournaments around the world, introduced in 2011, with successful players invited to the BWF Superseries Finals held at the year's end.

Women's singles

  Superseries tournament
  Superseries Premier tournament
  Superseries Finals tournament

BWF Grand Prix 
The BWF Grand Prix has two levels, the BWF Grand Prix and Grand Prix Gold. It is a series of badminton tournaments sanctioned by the Badminton World Federation (BWF) since 2007. The World Badminton Grand Prix sanctioned by International Badminton Federation since 1983.

Women's singles

  BWF Grand Prix Gold tournament
  IBF/BWF Grand Prix tournament

IBF International 
Women's singles

Women's doubles

Record against selected opponents 
Record against year-end Finals finalists, World Championships semi-finalists, and Olympic quarter-finalists.

References

External links 
 

1976 births
Living people
Badminton players from Shanghai
Chinese female badminton players
Hong Kong female badminton players
Badminton players at the 2004 Summer Olympics
Badminton players at the 2008 Summer Olympics
Olympic badminton players of Hong Kong
Badminton players at the 2002 Asian Games
Badminton players at the 2006 Asian Games
Asian Games gold medalists for Hong Kong
Asian Games bronze medalists for Hong Kong
Asian Games medalists in badminton
Medalists at the 2002 Asian Games
Medalists at the 2006 Asian Games
World No. 1 badminton players